Drosophila tripunctata is a species of vinegar fly in the Immigrans-tripunctata radiation of the subgenus Drosophila.

References

Further reading

 

tripunctata
Articles created by Qbugbot
Insects described in 1862